Seminole is a city in Seminole County, Oklahoma, United States. The population was 7,488 at the 2010 census. Seminole experienced a large population growth in the 1920s due to an oil boom.

History
The city was platted in 1906 as a relocation setting for the residents of Tidmore, when the railroad line was placed north of the town. When Oklahoma Territory and Indian Territory merged to become the U.S. state of Oklahoma in 1907, there were 206 residents.

Seminole competed to be the county seat of Seminole County, but lost out to Wewoka.

Upon the discovery of a high-producing oil well in the city in 1926, Seminole transformed from a town of 854 to a boom town of 25,000 to 30,000 residents. In August 1970 Seminole hosted its first All-Night Gospel Singing. During its heyday an estimated twenty-five thousand people attended the annual event. After the boom, the population declined to about 11,000 and remained that way until 1970.

There are multiple structures in the Seminole area listed on the National Register of Historic Places. They include the Home Stake Oil and Gas Company Building, Mekasukey Academy, the Seminole Municipal Building, the Sinclair Loading Rack, Strother Memorial Chapel, and the W.E. Grisso Mansion.

The town was heavily damaged by an EF2 tornado on May 4, 2022.

Geography
Seminole is located at  (35.241132, -96.668419).

Demographics

As of the census of 2000, there were 6,899 people, 2,760 households, and 1,827 families residing in the city. The population density was 494.7 people per square mile (190.9/km). There were 3,172 housing units at an average density of 227.4 per square mile (87.8/km). The racial makeup of the city was 73.42% White, 3.97% African American, 16.38% Native American, 0.32% Asian, 0.04% Pacific Islander, 0.72% from other races, and 5.15% from two or more races. Hispanic or Latino of any race were 2.61% of the population.

There were 2,760 households, out of which 30.7% had children under the age of 18 living with them, 46.6% were married couples living together, 15.3% had a female householder with no husband present, and 33.8% were non-families. 29.3% of all households were made up of individuals, and 15.9% had someone living alone who was 65 years of age or older. The average household size was 2.45 and the average family size was 3.02.

In the city, the population was spread out, with 26.5% under the age of 18, 10.5% from 18 to 24, 24.3% from 25 to 44, 19.7% from 45 to 64, and 19.1% who were 65 years of age or older. The median age was 36 years. For every 100 females, there were 87.8 males. For every 100 females age 18 and over, there were 81.7 males.

The median income for a household in the city was $25,120, and the median income for a family was $29,091. Males had a median income of $26,765 versus $17,474 for females. The per capita income for the city was $12,946. About 16.3% of families and 19.9% of the population were below the poverty line, including 28.2% of those under age 18 and 8.9% of those age 65 or over.

Education
The town is served by Seminole Public Schools. Seminole High School is the local high school. Seminole State College is located in the town.

Transportation
Seminole is served by US Route 270, US Route 377, Oklahoma State Highway 3E, and Oklahoma State Highway 9. 

Seminole Municipal Airport (KSRE, or FAA ID: SRE), owned by the city and located about 3 miles to the north, features two runways, the longer of which is paved and 5004’ by 75’.

Commercial air transportation is available out of Will Rogers World Airport, about 63 miles west-northwest.

Recreation
Sportsman Lake is to the east-southeast of town.   Along with the associated 1400-acre wildlife refuge which surrounds it, the lake offers boat docks and ramps; primitive campsites as well as RV sites; equestrian trails and facilities; and, other amenities.

Wewoka Lake is further to the east-southeast.  While developed by the City of Wewoka in the 1920’s as a water reservoir, opportunities at the lake today include fishing & boating; RV & primitive camping; and, swimming & water skiing.

Notable people
 David L. Boren, former Oklahoma Governor, State Senator, and former President of the University of Oklahoma
 Joe Liggins, musician, early pioneer of rock and roll, The Honeydripper.
 Ronald Chase, arts educator, painter, actor, photographer, filmmaker, opera designer
 Aaron Gwyn, novelist and short story writer
 Enoch Kelly Haney, Principal Chief of the Seminole Nation, artist, and former Oklahoma State Senator
 Edmond Harjo, Seminole Code Talker during World War II and recipient of the Congressional Gold Medal
 Arthur Jones, founder of Nautilus, Inc.
 Jesse Pearson, actor and screenwriter, born in Seminole in 1930
 Troy N. Smith, founder of Sonic Drive-In
 William C. Wantland, Bishop of the Episcopal Diocese of Eau Claire

References

External links
 City of Seminole official website

Cities in Seminole County, Oklahoma
Cities in Oklahoma